The coat of arms of Austria-Hungary was that country's symbol during its existence from the Austro-Hungarian Compromise of 1867 to its dissolution in 1918. The double-headed eagle of the ruling House of Habsburg-Lorraine was used by the common Imperial and Royal (k. u. k.) institutions of Austria-Hungary or the dual monarchy. Additionally, each of the two parts of the real union had its own coat of arms.

As the double-headed eagle was reminiscent of the Reichsadler insignia of the defunct Holy Roman Empire and also the symbol of the Cisleithanian ('Austrian') half of the real union, the Hungarian government urged for the introduction of a new common coat of arms, which took place in 1915, in the midst of World War I. The new insignia combined the coat of arms of the separate halves of the Dual Monarchy, linked by the armorials of the Habsburg-Lorraine dynasty and the motto indivisibiliter ac inseparabiliter ('indivisible and inseparable' ).

Common coat of arms

Coat of arms of the two constituent countries

Regional coat of arms

See also

 Coat of arms of Austria
 Coat of arms of Hungary

External links

Austria-Hungary
Austrian coats of arms
National symbols of Austria-Hungary
Hungarian coats of arms

de:Österreich-Ungarn#Wappen